The British Rail Class 195 is a class of diesel multiple-unit passenger train from the Civity family manufactured by CAF, owned by Eversholt Rail Group and currently operated by Northern Trains. A total of 58 units have been built; 25 two-car units and 33 three-car units. The class is almost identical to the Class 331 also produced by CAF, which is the electric version of the Class 195, differing only in traction type and (in some units) vehicle formation.

They were first introduced on 1 July 2019, entering service with the previous operator Arriva Rail North on the Manchester Airport and Liverpool Lime Street via Warrington, and Manchester Airport to Barrow-in-Furness routes. The final 195 unit entered service in December 2020 and all 58 units work across all non-electrified routes across the Northern network.

History
The introduction of new rolling stock for the Northern franchise was fuelled by the need to phase out the unpopular Pacer trains by 2020. The tender for the then-new franchise in 2015 originally permitted the continued use of Pacer trains, as it was judged by the Department for Transport (DfT) that a new rolling-stock order represented "poor value for money.". However the House of Commons Transport Select Committee described the continued use of Pacer trains as "unacceptable" and recommended that the Secretary of State use franchise specification power to include the need for a new rolling-stock order. Subsequently, the then Secretary of State for Transport Patrick McLoughlin issued a ministerial directive in February 2015 to force the new franchise to include a new rolling-stock order as part of the franchise agreement, which would enable the Pacer trains to be phased out.

The announcement of the new trains was made by now-previous operator Arriva UK Trains when it was confirmed that it would become the next operator of the Northern franchise (after Serco-Abellio) from 1 April 2016. The Class 195 order was based on Arriva's belief that the ageing and dilapidated state of rolling stock in Northern England was an inherent obstacle to enticing new passengers  particularly motorists  and that investing in new modern trains represented the best long-term strategy for enabling passenger growth.

CAF was selected by Arriva, as it was the only manufacturer able to build both diesel and electric multiple units from the same platform, Civity, thus increasing familiarity for drivers and reducing maintenance costs once in operation. Bombardier made a bid to produce electric Aventra units but was unable to offer a sister diesel unit which Arriva required. Furthermore, Bombardier already had a long order book for Aventra units and Arriva believed that CAF was in a stronger position to guarantee on-time delivery of the units.

Construction of the bodyshells began in Zaragoza in July 2017. The wheelsets were constructed in Beasain and final assembly of the units took place in Irun. The first completed Class 195 unit began undergoing tests at the Velim test track in May 2018. The first unit arrived in England in June 2018 and testing on the main line began in September 2018.

Description

Arriva UK Trains stated its aim for a "step-change in quality" for the new trains when compared with older trains in the Northern fleet such as the Pacers and Sprinters. The interior, layout and driver cab of the Class 195 (DMU) are similar to their sister units, the Class 331 (EMU), the differences being in power generation and drivetrain.

The 195s have a 'doors-at-thirds' arrangement, and a top speed limited to 100 mph. They have air conditioning, power sockets, one toilet per train, open gangways between individual carriages, passenger compartment CCTV, provision for wheelchair passengers, and a WiFi system. All trains are fitted with an automated audio information system, as well as display screens - six in each carriage, ensuring all passengers have an unobstructed view of at least one. These screens convey a variety of information, including station arrival times and informing alighting passengers when they need to be in a different carriage due to platforms being too short to accommodate the train.

Northern selected a "wide and spacious" vestibule area to allow for quicker passenger flows when boarding and disembarking to minimise dwell times and thus reduce delays. The large spaces around the doors create a flexible space, with flip-down seats for quiet times of day, and standing space in times of overcrowding where the objective is to ensure that all passengers can board. Since the units are not fitted with fixed luggage racks (as these often reduce capacity on peak-time commuter trains) the space by the doors can also be used to store luggage and prams - thus not impacting on the capacity of the train or safety of passengers wishing to alight or board. In maintaining an objective for the interior to be spacious, seats are cantilevered off the body frame and there are no internal doors, with open gangways between carriages.

The units were designed with a projected lifespan of 35years and it was planned they will operate beyond 2050 with maintenance and refurbishment. A feature is a digital seat reservation system, however this is to future-proof the train and Northern did not envisage using it on many, if any routes. Although the vast majority of services will operate as three- or four-car formations (two-car units doubled), some three-car units will be doubled up to form six-car services, such as the route between Manchester Oxford Road and Liverpool via Warrington Central. As a result, they are fitted with Automatic Selective Door Operation (ASDO) for use on routes where station platform lengths are not sufficient to fully accommodate the train. This ASDO system is linked to an automated system which informs the passengers through both audio announcements and the passenger information screens in each saloon.

Operators

Northern Trains

On 1 March 2020 the Northern franchise was taken over by Northern Trains. All Class 195 units transferred to Northern Trains on 1 March 2020 along with the rest of the Northern fleet.

Named units
 195104 – Deva Victrix
 195109 – Pride of Cumbria
195111 – Key Worker
 195116 – Proud To Be Northern
 195128 – Calder Champion

Fleet details
Originally, 25 two-car and 30 three-car units were ordered; in November 2018 it was announced that an additional 3 three-car units had been ordered. A tender notice for a further 20 multiple units was published in December 2021.

Vehicle numbering
Individual vehicles are numbered in the ranges as follows, with the last three digits of each vehicle number matching those of the unit to which the vehicle belongs:

European Vehicle Numbers for the fleet are devised by prefixing the domestic vehicle number with type code 95, country code 70, and a leading zero; "95700...".

Livery illustration

See also
 British Rail Class 196 - A diesel multiple unit variant of the CAF Civity UK platform built for West Midlands Trains.
 British Rail Class 197 - A diesel multiple unit variant of the CAF Civity UK platform being built for Transport for Wales Rail.
 British Rail Class 331 - An electric multiple unit variant of the CAF Civity UK platform also built for Northern.
 British Rail Class 397 - An electric multiple unit variant of the CAF Civity UK platform built for TransPennine Express.

References

195
CAF multiple units
Train-related introductions in 2019